The now-called Putri Bumi Indonesia (Eng: Indonesian Earth Princess, previously named Miss Earth Indonesia in 2013-2020 and Miss Indonesia Earth in 2007-2010) is an annual national environmental-themed beauty pageant promoting environmental awareness in Indonesia. Because in 2022 El John Pageants lost the franchise of Miss Earth to PT. Mahakarya Duta Pesona Indonesia, the winners of Putri Bumi Indonesia instead represents Indonesia in the Miss Eco International pageant until 2023 before Miss Mega Bintang Indonesia took the license. The first and current Putri Bumi Indonesia titleholder is Eunike Suwandi from Jakarta.

History

In 2021, El John Pageants announced that the contest rebranded the name with Putri Bumi Indonesia (Eng: Indonesian Earth Princess). The pageant will choose a winner as Indonesias' representative in Miss Eco International until 2023. Because the organization lost the franchise to Miss Earth Pageant to PT. Mahakarya Duta Pesona Indonesia.

Titleholders

International representations
Color key

Miss Eco Indonesia
Below are the Indonesian representatives to the Miss Eco International pageant according to the year in which they participated. The special awards received and their final placements in the aforementioned global beauty competition are also displayed.

Winners

Putri Bumi Indonesia
Below are the winner of Putri Bumi Indonesia Pageants.

Putri Lingkungan Indonesia
From 2021, Runner-up 1 Putri Bumi Indonesia or Putri Lingkungan Indonesia.

Putri Bumi Indonesia Udara
Below are the titleholder of Runner-up 2 Putri Bumi Indonesia or Putri Bumi Indonesia Udara.

Putri Bumi Indonesia Air
Below are the titleholder of Runner-up 3 Putri Bumi Indonesia or Putri Bumi Indonesia Air.

Putri Bumi Indonesia Energi Hijau
Below are the titleholder of Runner-up 4 Putri Bumi Indonesia or Putri Bumi Indonesia Energi Hijau.

Placements at International Pageants

The following are the placements of Putri Bumi Indonesia titleholders for their participation at international pageants throughout the years.

 1 Placements at Miss Eco International (2022). The highest placements are Jessica Grace as Top 21 Miss Eco International 2022.

Before Putri Bumi Indonesia

Miss Eco Indonesia
Below are the Indonesian representative to the Miss Eco International pageant before Putri Bumi Indonesia pageants according to the year in which they participated. The special awards received and their final placements in the aforementioned global beauty competition are also displayed.

See also

Miss Earth
Puteri Indonesia
Puteri Indonesia Lingkungan
Puteri Indonesia Pariwisata
Miss Indonesia
Miss Grand Indonesia
Indonesia at major beauty pageants

References

External links
  Official website

Beauty pageants in Indonesia
Indonesia
Indonesian awards